The 2023 Fanatec GT World Challenge Asia Powered by AWS will be the fifth season of SRO Motorsports Group and Team Asia One GT Management's GT World Challenge Asia, an auto racing series for grand tourer cars in Asia. The races will be contested with GT3-spec and GT4-spec cars with hopes of GT2-spec entries. The season will begin on 13 May at the Chang International Circuit in Thailand and is scheduled to end on 24 September at Sepang in Malaysia.

Calendar

Entry list

Race results

See also
 2023 British GT Championship
 2023 GT World Challenge Europe
 2023 GT World Challenge Europe Endurance Cup
 2023 GT World Challenge Europe Sprint Cup
 2023 GT World Challenge America
 2023 GT World Challenge Australia
 2023 Intercontinental GT Challenge

References

External links

GT World Challenge Asia
GT World Challenge Asia
GT World Challenge Asia